USS Lake Champlain (CG-57) is a  guided missile cruiser in the United States Navy.  It is the third ship to be named Lake Champlain, in honor of Battle of Lake Champlain, which took place during the War of 1812.

Ship history
Lake Champlain was laid down 3 March 1986, at Ingalls Shipbuilding, Pascagoula, Mississippi, launched 3 April 1987, and commissioned 12 August 1988, at Intrepid Pier at the Intrepid Sea-Air-Space Museum in New York City, Captain Ralph K. Martin commanding.  She then steamed to her homeport of San Diego, via Cape Horn, South America, losing part of her hurricane bow in heavy seas.  She has been to the Persian Gulf on multiple occasions, first as a part of Operation Desert Shield, then later following Desert Storm. She aided in the evacuation of the Philippines during the Mount Pinatubo eruption while transiting to the Persian Gulf.

Lake Champlain is currently assigned to Carrier Group One.

Accidents and incidents

2007 explosion
On 10 November 2007 an explosion occurred in the ship's hull during routine maintenance in a San Diego dry dock.  Six workers were injured, one of them critically. The explosion was caused when flammable gases ignited inside the fuel-tank compartment where the workers were working. The U.S. Occupational Safety and Health Administration investigated the incident. OSHA cited NASSCO, a Navy contractor in charge of the work, for seven serious safety violations and two minor safety violations at the site. The explosion occurred one day after NASSCO subcontractor Técnico Corporation fired a safety inspector who was responsible for measuring oxygen levels in enclosed worksites. The inspector subsequently filed a lawsuit against his former employer, alleging that he was a whistleblower who was fired after warning superiors that additional safety measures were needed on the ship.

2017 collision
No one was injured. The Navy ship had attempted to contact the vessel, but the fishing boat lacked a radio. The fishing vessel did not respond to Lake Champlains emergency whistle. Both the cruiser and the fishing vessel were undamaged enough to be able to sail away under their own power.

See also
 Carrier Strike Group One

References

Image gallery

External links

 Official web site
 

 

Ticonderoga-class cruisers
Ships built in Pascagoula, Mississippi
1987 ships
Cold War cruisers of the United States
Cruisers of the United States
Carrier Strike Group One